Marilyn Castonguay is a Canadian actress, best known for her performance in the 2012 film L'Affaire Dumont. A graduate of the National Theatre School of Canada, her performance in L'Affaire Dumont garnered a nomination for Best Actress at the 1st Canadian Screen Awards.

She has also appeared in the films Louis Cyr, Miraculum, Guardian Angel (L'Ange gardien), Ça sent la coupe, An Extraordinary Person (Quelqu'un d'extraordinaire), Wild Skin (La peau sauvage), The Decline (Jusqu'au déclin) and Frontiers (Frontières), and the television series Vertige, Au secours de Béatrice, Fatale-Station and Happily Married (C'est comme ça que je t'aime).

References

External links

Canadian film actresses
Canadian television actresses
Actresses from Quebec
Living people
National Theatre School of Canada alumni
Year of birth missing (living people)